The Cox Arboretum and Gardens MetroPark is a  arboretum and park located at 6733 Springboro Pike, Dayton, Ohio (in Miami Township, south of the city proper). It is open daily without charge. Cox Arboretum and Gardens MetroPark is one of many Dayton area parks within the Five Rivers Metroparks system.

The arboretum was established in 1962 when James M. Cox, Jr., and family donated their property to a nonprofit foundation, which continues to help fund the arboretum. In 1972 the land was given to Five Rivers Metroparks in a public/private partnership.

See also 
 List of botanical gardens in the United States

External links 
 Cox Arboretum and Gardens MetroPark
 U.S. Geological Survey Map at the U.S. Geological Survey Map Website. Retrieved November 11th, 2022.

Arboreta in Ohio
Botanical gardens in Ohio
Miamisburg, Ohio
Geography of Dayton, Ohio
Protected areas of Montgomery County, Ohio
Tourist attractions in Dayton, Ohio